The coins of the Brunei dollar are part of the physical form of current Brunei currency, the Brunei dollar. They have changed through time along with Brunei itself.  A British protectorate from 1888 until 1983, it is currently an independent member of the Commonwealth of Nations.

First Series
The decision was taken to adopt a native Bruneian currency called the Brunei dollar (or ringgit Brunei in Malay), which is divided into 100 cents (or sen in Malay). The portrait of the then Sultan, Omar Ali Saifuddin III (ruled 1950–1967), is depicted on the obverse. The reverse of these coins, and all subsequent series, was designed by Christopher Ironside OBE. The coins issued were 1, 5, 10, 20, and 50 sen.

Second Series
Sultan Hassanal Bolkiah acceded to the throne upon the abdication of his father in late 1967.  The title of the Sultan is given as SULTAN HASSANAL BOLKIAH I.  The same denominations as the 1967 coinage were retained and are still being struck.  Commemorative coins of $1 through to $1,000 were struck in this period.

Third Series
The title of the Sultan was changed to SULTAN HASSANAL BOLKIAH. In 1977, coins were struck with I and without I in the Sultan's title. Brunei became a fully independent member of the Commonwealth of Nations on January 1, 1984.

Fourth Series
An entirely new portrait depicting the Sultan facing forward was adopted. The title of the Sultan is now given as SULTAN HAJI HASSANAL BOLKIAH.

References

External links
Brunei Currency and Monetary Board
Brunei Currency Board

Brunei
Brunei dollar